Willi Horn (January 17, 1909 – May 31, 1989) was a German sprint canoeist, born in Berlin, who competed in the late 1930s. At the 1936 Summer Olympics in Berlin, he won a silver medal in the folding K-2 10000 m event.

References

External links
 
 
 

1909 births
1989 deaths
Canoeists from Berlin
Canoeists at the 1936 Summer Olympics
German male canoeists
Olympic canoeists of Germany
Olympic silver medalists for Germany
Olympic medalists in canoeing
Medalists at the 1936 Summer Olympics